Lennart Fremling (1946-2013) was a Swedish Liberal People's Party politician, member of the Riksdag 1991–1998 and again 2002–2006.

References

External links
 Biography

1946 births
2013 deaths
Members of the Riksdag 1991–1994
Members of the Riksdag 1994–1998
Members of the Riksdag 2002–2006
Members of the Riksdag from the Liberals (Sweden)